Daniel Ermentrout (January 24, 1837 – September 17, 1899) was an American politician from Pennsylvania who served as a Democratic member of the U.S. House of Representatives for Pennsylvania's 8th congressional district from 1881 to 1889 and for Pennsylvania's 9th congressional district from 1897 to 1899.  He also served as a member of the Pennsylvania State Senate for the 1st district from 1873 to 1874 and the 11th district from 1875 to 1888.

Early life and education
Ermentrout was born in Reading, Pennsylvania to William and Julia (Silvis) Ermentrout.  He attended Franklin and Marshall College in Lancaster, Pennsylvania, and the Elmwood Institute in Norristown, Pennsylvania. He studied law, was admitted to the bar in 1859 and commenced practice in Reading.

Career
He was elected district attorney in 1862 and served for three years.  He was solicitor for the city of Reading from 1867 to 1870, and a member of the board of school control of Reading from 1868 to 1876.  He was a delegate to the Democratic National Conventions in 1868 and 1880.  He was chairman of the standing committee of Berks County, Pennsylvania, in 1869, 1872, and 1873.  He served as a member of the Pennsylvania State Senate for the 1st district from 1873 to 1874 and the 11th district from 1875 to 1887.  He was appointed in October 1877 by Governor John F. Hartranft as a member of the Pennsylvania Statuary Commission.

Ermentrout was elected as a Democrat to the Forty-seventh and to the three succeeding Congresses.  He was an unsuccessful candidate for renomination in 1888.  He was a delegate to the Democratic State conventions from 1895 to 1899.  He was again elected to the Fifty-fifth and Fifty-sixth Congresses.

Death
He served in Congress until his death in Reading due to the effects of a choking incident in 1899.  Interment in Charles Evans Cemetery in Reading, Pennsylvania.

Personal life
Ermentrout was married to Adelaide Louise Metzger.

See also
List of United States Congress members who died in office (1790–1899)

Notes

Sources

The Political Graveyard

External links

|-

|-

|-

1837 births
1899 deaths
19th-century American politicians
Burials at Charles Evans Cemetery
County district attorneys in Pennsylvania
Franklin & Marshall College alumni
Democratic Party members of the United States House of Representatives from Pennsylvania
Pennsylvania lawyers
Democratic Party Pennsylvania state senators
Politicians from Reading, Pennsylvania
19th-century American lawyers